Yumakayevo (Yomaqay) is a rural locality (a village) in Vanyshevsky Selsoviet, Burayevsky District, Bashkortostan, Russia. The population was 205 as of 2010. There are 4 streets.

Geography 
Yumakayevo is located 25 km northeast of Burayevo (the district's administrative centre) by road. Varzitamak is the nearest rural locality.

References 

Rural localities in Burayevsky District